Maria van der Eycken, Lady of Rivieren (1571 in Brussels – 21 April 1636 in Porta Angelica Monastery, Flaumbach Valley, near Treis-Karden) was the wife of the Margrave Edward Fortunatus of Baden-Baden.

Early life 
She was born in Brussels as the daughter of Joost van der Eycken, Lord of the Nederloo and Rivieren, Governor of the city of Breda (d. 1591), and his wife, Barbara de Mol (d. 1596), daughter of Martin de Mol, Grand Falconer of the King of Spain in the Spanish Netherlands.

Biography 
On 13 March 1591 in Brussels, she married Margrave Edward Fortunatus of Baden-Baden.  As she was not a member of the high nobility, she was not considered a befitting wife for a margrave and their children were never accepted as relatives by his cousin Margrave Ernest Frederick of Baden-Durlach.  Nevertheless, their son William would inherit Baden-Baden.

Marie and Edward Fortunatus had the following children:
 William (1593–1677)
 Hermann Fortunatus (1595–1665)
 Charles Albert (born 1598 in Kastellaun – died 1626 at Hundschloss Castle, when he accidentally shot himself)
 Anna Marie Lucretia (born 1592 Murano – died 1654 in Kastellaun)

References 

 Joachim Kühn: Der Roman der Marie van Eycken, in: Ehen zur linken Hand in der europäischen Geschichte, Koehler, Stuttgart, 1968, pp. 105–123

 

  

Margravines of Baden-Baden
1571 births
1636 deaths
People of the Habsburg Netherlands
17th-century German people
Women of the Habsburg Netherlands
17th-century German women